Milton of Finavon is a hamlet in Angus, Scotland that lies adjacent to the A90 road on its southern side by the River South Esk. It is approximately 5 miles north-east of Forfar.

A quarter of a mile to the south lies Finavon Castle.

References

Villages in Angus, Scotland